Saam kap dai is a writing style combining Classical Chinese, Cantonese and Standard Chinese. The articles and stories written in saam kap dai first appeared in several Guangzhou newspapers in the 1940s and 1950s, eventually being popularized by its widespread use in Hong Kong newspapers from the late 1940s to the 1960s.

Saam kap dai is notable in how it uses the different systems to help reflect different registers in writing. Sentences with more Classical Chinese vocabulary and grammar give off the impression of more formality and authority, while those in Standard Chinese have a far more neutral and straightforward feel to them, and written Cantonese being far more informal and colloquial, often incorporating a lot of slang.

References

Chinese characters
Cantonese language
Classical Chinese
Writing
Mixed languages